The Mazda RT24-P also known as the Mazda Road to 24 – Prototype is a Daytona Prototype International built to the 2017 IMSA DPi regulations. The car is designed and built by Mazda Motorsports, in collaboration with Multimatic Motorsports, and is based on the Riley-Multimatic Mk. 30 LMP2 chassis. This car is eligible for use in the Daytona Prototype International (DPi) class of the IMSA sanctioned WeatherTech Sportscar Championship. It made its racing debut at the 2017 Rolex 24 at Daytona, with SpeedSource Race Engineering, running under the Mazda Motorsports banner. There have been plans to open the car to customer sales, although none have come to fruition so far.

Development

Initial development 
On the 16th of November 2016, Mazda unveiled the car at the 2016 Los Angeles Auto show. Aerodynamic development of the car was done in CFD, by Multimatic, with the car undergoing a number of bodywork changes, compared to the car it had been based upon, the Riley-Multimatic MkXXX. Nearly the entire front section of the car underwent a redesign, with the most notable changes being a new wheel pod design, as well as revised positions for the brake ducts and mirrors. At the rear, the wheel pods were also redesigned, and tapered sharply at the end, resulting in the car gaining its unique rear wing support design. Early on in testing, both cars initially featured a side exhaust, although during the Roar Before the 24 tests, one car was subsequently altered to run with Periscope exhausts, to evaluate the effectiveness of the concept. Following the Roar, both cars were altered to run with Periscope Exhausts, after the configuration was found to boost power. Mid-season, the car would receive a cooling update, on the #70 car at the 6 Hours of Watkins Glen.

Post-2017 upgrades 
It was later announced by Mazda in July 2017, following the round at the Canadian Tire Motorsport Park, that its 2017 Programme with Speedsource was to be terminated, with immediate effect, in favour of early preparation for next season's campaign with Joest Racing. Joest Racing said it would be conducting testing and evaluation of the car in 2 stages, and to be held in North America, and also in Europe, with the team focusing on the initial car, before shifting to the newer upgraded chassis. The European phase of testing then began with a shakedown of the car at the short course of the Hockenheimring Baden-Württemberg, in Germany. It was subsequently revealed by Multimatic that the series of upgrades intended for the car was to cost a million dollars, with the upgrades being focused on the aero, and mechanical side of the car. The heavily revised Mazda RT24-P would have its initial Shakedown at the Donington Park Circuit in the United Kingdom. The US Testing programme then began on the 1st of November, at the Daytona International Speedway. Additional testing was also subsequently carried out at the Sebring International Raceway. The new heavily upgraded car was then formally unveiled to the public at the 2017 LA Motor Show, in a new livery.

Ahead of the 2019 season, the car once again underwent a series of upgrades, focusing on the engine, and aimed at improving its reliability, and raising its power limit.

Racing history

2017 IMSA WeatherTech Sportscar Championship 

At the first race of the season, the season-opening 2017 24 Hours of Daytona, the 2 cars struggled during qualifying, with both cars coming home 9th and 10th during the session, trailing the pole-sitting Cadillac by 3 seconds, the #55 finishing ahead of the #70. The car's debut race would prove to also be challenging for Mazda, with the #55 car retiring just 4 hours from the finish, after the crew of the #55 had clawed their way up the order to 5th overall, before the car became engulfed in flames in pitlane, due to an oil fire. The sister #70 also encountered a drama-filled race, with the car finishing 197 laps down the leader, after a series of troubles, including a trip to the pitlane on just the second lap of the race, due to a piece of plastic becoming lodged into the air intake, while later in the race, a penalty, combined with a collision with the #10 Cadillac DPi-V.R, necessitated yet another unscheduled trip to the pitlane, in order to repair the rear wing assembly, before the car became beset with clutch and transmission issues, in the 6th hour of the race.

At the second race of the season, the 2017 12 Hours of Sebring, the 2 cars came home 8th and 10th during the qualifying session, the #90 Riley sandwiched between the 8th placed #55, and 10th placed #70, with the #70 trailing the pole sitting car by 2.1 seconds, while the #55 1.7 seconds behind, in a much improved showing compared to Daytona. During the race, only the #55 Mazda made it home to the finish, 5th in the Prototype class, and 29th overall, 29 laps down on the leader, while the #70 had an eventful race, including a sizeable incident on the entry to the final corner and consequently losing a much time due to repairs.

At the third race of the season, the 2017 BUBBA Burger Sports Car Grand Prix, held at the Long Beach Circuit, the cars saw an upturn in pace, with the #55 car qualifying in 3rd, just 6 tenths off the pole sitting #10 Wayne Taylor Racing Cadillac, while the sister #70 car qualified further back, in 7th, 1.4 seconds behind the pole sitting car. The race saw the #55 car score the first podium for the car, with the pairing of Tristan Nunez, and Jonathan Bomarito coming in 3rd, 15 seconds behind the leader, due to yellow flag, while the #70 finished a lap down, in 21st overall, and 7th in class.

At the fourth race of the season, the Advance Auto Parts Sportscar Showdown, held at the Circuit of the Americas, the cars fell back pace-wise, relative to the rest of the field for qualifying, with the #55 ending the session 7th, 2.4 seconds slower than the pole sitter, and the #70 qualifying behind in 10th, 3.1 seconds away from the pole time. During the race, both cars would suffer from electrical issues, with the #55 being forced to retire, while the #70 finished well down the order, in 33rd position overall.

For the fifth race of the season, the Chevrolet Detroit Grand Prix, held at the Detroit street circuit, it had initially appeared that the #55 of Jonathan Bomarito would start from the front row of the grid, in 2nd place, having been beaten to pole by Renger Van Der Zande in the #90 VisitFlorida Racing Riley-Multimatic MkXXX during the qualifying session, which lasted a mere 5 minutes. However, this result was later nullified, after it was determined insufficient green-flag running had occurred for it to be an official session, after Ricky Taylor had set the fastest lap in the session, only to crash moments later, resulting in the session-ending red flag with just 5 minutes of running left on the clock. As a result, it was determined that the starting order will be set by championship standings for the race. During the race, the #70 would score the car's second podium, and the first for the #70 crew of Tom Long and Joel Miller, with the #70 finishing 34.502 seconds behind the race leader. In the sister #55 car, Tristan Nunez had originally looked set to come home 6th, but later took advantage of a late-race spin by Stephen Simpson in the JDC-Miller Oreca, to finish 5th.

At the sixth round of the season, the Sahlen's Six Hours of the Glen, during qualifying, both cars emerged in 9th and 10th, the #55 leading the #70 crew, 2.5 seconds and 2.6 seconds adrift of the polesitting #2 Tequila Patrón ESM Ligier Nissan DPi respectively. On race day, the #55 came home with a podium finish 7.363 seconds behind the winners, with the 3rd-place finish being the second consecutive podium for the car, and second podium of the season for the #55 team, after Bomarito successfully held off Olivier Pla in the #52 Ligier JS P217 of PR1/Mathiasen Motorsports. However, the sister #70 car did not enjoy the same level of success in the race, being hit with a penalty at the start of the race, for changing tires on the grid, before being struck by a mechanical failure which hampered the turbocharger, leading to a loss of power, and eventually retiring from the race as a result.

At the seventh round of the season, the Mobil 1 SportsCar Grand Prix, held at the Canadian Tire Motorsport Park, the two cars had a mixed session, with the #55 coming in 5th, clocking in a 1:08.959, just 5 tenths away from pole, while the #70 in 10th, rounding out the Prototype class, finishing 1.5 seconds behind the polesitter, the #10 Wayne Taylor Racing Cadillac DPi-V.R. On race day, the two cars came home in 4th and 5th, the #55 leading the #70 home, with the #55 having been in the top 3 positions at one point, pitting during a heavy shower, but eventually falling back, as the track dried up following the downpour, allowing the slick-shod runners to slice their way up their field, while the #55 was forced into the pits for a change to slicks.

The Mobil 1 Sportscar Grand Prix would ultimately be the last time the car would be campaigned in the 2017 season, with Mazda announcing it would dissolve its partnership with the SpeedSource Race Engineering team, that had been running both cars, with immediate effect on the 18th of July 2017, just 9 days after the race, to prepare for the 2018 WeatherTech SportsCar Championship, with Joest Racing, who would campaign the cars under the Mazda Team Joest banner. It was also announced, that the team's full-season drivers would be involved in the testing for the updated prototype with Joest. This would also mark the final race for the SpeedSource Race Engineering outfit, with the team closing its doors, and putting up all its equipment for auction at the end of the year.

2018 WeatherTech Sportscar Championship 
At the first race of the season, the season-opening 2018 24 Hours of Daytona, the updated cars endured a mixed qualifying, on their return to competition, the #55 coming in 9th overall in the Prototype field, 5 tenths off the pole-sitting #10 Wayne Taylor Racing Cadillac DPi-V.R, while the #77 did not set a lap, after the Joest Racing team observed something an oddity in the telemetry. The race was no better for the team, with both cars hitting trouble early and being unable to recover, the #55 retiring after a major fire, and the #77 later suffering gearbox issues amongst other things. Both cars failed to make it to the finish, which left the team with a much-reduced mileage compared to their class rivals, many who successfully made it to the chequered flag.

At the second race of the season, the 2018 12 Hours of Sebring, both cars fell back against the competition during the qualifying session, with the #77 coming in 7th, 8 tenths behind the leading #90 Cadillac DPi-V.R of Spirit of Daytona Racing, while the #55 came in 9th, half a tenth behind the sister car. For the first 3 hours of the race, the Mazdas ran a smooth and event-free race, with both cars on the lead lap, running sixth and seventh, with the #55 leading the #77, and being within 30 seconds of the leading car, the #31 Cadillac DPi-V.R. Owing to the cars being able to consume lesser fuel than its competition, resulting in fewer pit stops for refuelling, the cars were able to take the lead periodically, by the fourth hour, although it was by this time that issues surfaced, with the #77 having issues with its rear brakes, with the time spent on rectifying the issue costing the car 24 minutes of track time, falling over 5 laps behind the leaders. On the other hand, the sister #55 surged ahead, climbing to fifth, towards the end of the fifth hour, and taking third at the start of the sixth hour. By the 11th hour of the race, the #55 car was now leading the race, although it was later force to cede the lead to the #22 ESM Nissan DPi, due to faulty headlamps, requiring an additional unscheduled pitstop. However, the crew of the #55 would see their effort come to naught at the final hour, as in the final pitstop, the #55 suffered from an engine ignition issue, losing 1 lap in the process, and demoting the car to 6th at the finish.

At the third round of the season, the BUBBA Burger Sports Car Grand Prix, held on the streets of Long Beach, the #55 came in third during qualifying, before both cars came home 4th and 9th, the #77 leading the #55 home. At the fourth round, held at the Mid-Ohio Sports Car Course, both the #55 Mazda RT24-P and the #77 challenged throughout the first half of the race before fading towards the end, with the #55's retiring just after the halfway mark, following contact with a GT car resulting in suspension damage, the #77 meanwhile, finishing the race third. The fifth round of the season, held at the Detroit street circuit saw both cars fail to reach the chequered flag, after both cars qualified 8th and 9th, the #77 running out of fuel with four corners to go, while the #55 retired after a drive-shaft failure within just five laps of the race.

Complete IMSA SportsCar Championship results 
Results in bold indicate pole position. Results in italics indicate fastest lap.

References 

Mazda racing cars
Sports racing cars
Sports prototypes